Laicism refers to the policies and principles where the state plays a more active role in excluding religious visibility from the public domain.  The term laïcité was coined in 1871 by French educator and later Nobel Peace Prize laureate Ferdinand Buisson, who advocated a religion-free school curriculum.

Secularism in France has been described to be laicist in its form.

History

The term "laicism" arose in France in the 19th century for an anticlerical stance that opposed any ecclesiastical influence on matters of the French state, but not Christianity itself. In 1894, the Dreyfus Affair began in France. Domestic political upheavals, latent antisemitism and attempts by clerical-restorationist circles to exert influence led to years of social polarization in the country. In foreign policy, diplomatic relations between France and the Vatican were broken off in 1904. They were not resumed until 1921. Domestically, the 1905 law on the separation of church and state came into effect, which the then deputy and later prime minister Aristide Briand in particular had worked to have passed. This was the first concrete application of the principle created by Buisson. The term laïcité was first used in the 1946 constitution. Its Article 1 reads: La France est une République indivisible, laïque, démocratique et sociale.

See also
 Laicization
 Secularism
 Secularization

References

Religion and politics